Netball at the 1997 South Pacific Mini Games in Pago Pago, American Samoa was held from 12–18 August 1997.

Results

Pool games

5th/6th play off

Bronze Medal match

Gold Medal match

Final standings

See also
 Netball at the Pacific Games

References

1997 Pacific Games
South Pacific Mini Games
Netball at the Pacific Games